Metelishchi is a rural locality (a village) in Belokrestskoye Rural Settlement, Chagodoshchensky District, Vologda Oblast, Russia. The population was 9 as of 2002.

Geography 
Zapolye is the nearest rural locality.

References 

Rural localities in Chagodoshchensky District